The Orphic Argonautica or  Argonautica Orphica is a Greek epic poem dating from the 5th–6th centuries CE. It is narrated in the first person in the name of Orpheus and tells the story of Jason and the Argonauts. It is not known who the real author is. The poem is found in manuscripts either on its own or together with the Orphic Hymns and other hymns such as the Homeric Hymns and those of Proclus and Callimachus. The poem was lost, but in the fifteenth century it was found and copied in a manuscript (Codex Matritensis gr. 4562) by the Neoplatonic Greek scholar Constantine Lascaris, who considered a Pythagorean Orpheus. Another related work is the Lithica (describing the properties and symbolism of different stones).

The narrative is basically similar to that in other versions of the story, such as the Argonautica of Apollonius Rhodius, on which it is probably based. The main differences are the emphasis on the role of Orpheus and a more mythological, less realistic technique of narration. In the Argonautica Orphica, unlike in Apollonius Rhodius, it is claimed that the Argo was the first ship ever built.

References

Further reading
  (with the Lithica translated to Portuguese)
  (about the connection between this Argonautica and Apollonius')
 M. L. West, The Orphic Poems (Oxford: Oxford University Press, 1983. ) pp. 37–38.
 Les argonautiques orphiques, ed. Francis Vian (Collection des universités de France), Belles Lettres 2003,  (Greek with French translation)

External links

Argonautica Orphica — original Greek text with Latin translation.
Orphic Argonautica — English translation of the poem by Jason Colavito.

Ancient Greek epic poems
Byzantine literature
Orpheus

Works based on the Argonautica